Jessica Lois Ware (born 15 October 1984) is an English singer, songwriter and broadcaster. Ware came to prominence following the release of her debut studio album, Devotion (2012), which peaked at number five on the UK Albums Chart, produced the single "Wildest Moments", and was shortlisted for the Mercury Prize. Her second studio album, Tough Love (2014), reached number nine in the UK and produced the songs "Tough Love" and "Say You Love Me", which was followed by her third studio album, Glasshouse (2017), which reached number seven in the UK. Her fourth studio album, What's Your Pleasure? (2020), was released to critical acclaim, and reached number three in the UK. Songs from the album included "Spotlight", "Save a Kiss" and "Remember Where You Are". Ware has been nominated for a total of six Brit Awards including one for Best New Artist and four for British Female Solo Artist. Ware also presents a food podcast titled Table Manners with her mother, Lennie Ware, which was launched in 2017.

Early life
Ware was born at Queen Charlotte's Hospital in Hammersmith, London, on 15 October 1984. She was raised in Clapham, London. She is the daughter of Helena (née Keell, usually called Lennie), a social worker, and John Ware, a BBC Panorama reporter, who divorced when she was 10. She is the younger sister of English actress Hannah Ware. Her mother was supportive in her early musical career and Ware considers her to be "her hero", saying "She brought up my sister, brother and me with so much love and fun and always told me I could do anything I want." Ware's mother is Jewish and she was raised in the faith.

Ware was educated at Alleyn's School, a co-educational independent school in Dulwich in South London, where she was a schoolmate of Florence Welch, Jack Peñate, and Felix White of the Maccabees. She then attended the University of Sussex, where she graduated with a degree in English literature. After her studies, Ware briefly worked as a journalist at The Jewish Chronicle, did sports journalism at The Daily Mirror and worked behind the scenes at TV company Love Productions. There, she was a colleague of Erika Leonard, otherwise known as E. L. James, the author of Fifty Shades of Grey.

Music career

2009–2011: Career beginnings
In the years prior to releasing her first solo album, Ware did backing vocals at live shows for Jack Peñate (who took her on tour in the U.S.) and Man Like Me. Ware said she learned a lot during her time with Jack Peñate: "Performing with him was really good training, because I got to learn all about how other people do it – I was able to perform live without the pressure of being a lead singer. It gave me a taste of what to expect, and it prepared me for what I’m doing now."

One of Peñate's bandmates, Tic, first introduced Ware to SBTRKT; Ware and SBTRKT went on to collaborate on "Nervous" (2010). She consequently met Sampha, then known as SBTRKT's main collaborator. They created "Valentine" together, which was released on a special edition, heart-shaped vinyl by Young Turks in 2011. "Valentine" was partly inspired by James Blake's song "The Wilhelm Scream" and based on their own personal experiences in love. The music video for "Valentine" was directed by Marcus Söderlund. "Nervous", "Valentine" and an additional collaboration with DJ Joker ("The Vision") led Ware to a record deal with PMR Records. She also featured on Ceremonials, the 2011 album by Florence and the Machine in which her good friend Florence Welch is lead singer.

On 14 October 2011, Ware released her debut solo single "Strangest Feeling" on limited 10" purple vinyl, although the song did not chart on the UK Singles Chart.

2011–2013: Devotion

On 20 August 2012, Ware released her debut album Devotion, which peaked at number five on the UK Albums Chart. The album's lead single "Running" was released on 24 February 2012. "110%" was released as the album's second single on 13 April, peaking at number 61 in the United Kingdom. "Wildest Moments" was released as the album's third single on 29 June, peaking at number 46 in the United Kingdom. "Night Light" was released as the fourth single on 24 August.

Devotion was announced as a nominee for the prestigious Mercury Prize that year.  Ware toured in the United Kingdom in the early part of March 2013, supported by Laura Mvula, starting with Cambridge, Manchester, Glasgow, Birmingham, Oxford, Bristol and ending in London. The United Kingdom tour was followed by a European tour in the second half of March 2013 and a US tour in April 2013. In the summer of 2013, Ware played many festivals all over the world, and at the end of 2013, Jessie went on tour in the United States again.

2014–2018: Tough Love and Glasshouse 
Ware's second album, Tough Love, was released on 6 October 2014. Ware began writing the album earlier that year. The album peaked at number nine on the UK Albums Chart, becoming her second top ten album. "Tough Love" was the first single to be taken from the album and released on 3 August 2014. "Tough Love" was compared to "Prince at his minimalist '80's best" by Pitchfork. "Tough Love" is produced together with BenZel, the production duo composed of London post-bass producer Two Inch Punch and mega-producer Benny Blanco who Ware previously worked with on the single "If You Love Me"; Benzel are also executive producers of the album. Ed Sheeran co-wrote the song "Say You Love Me".  Ware played the Wilderness Festival (7–10 August 2014); a pair of additional dates at Berlin Festival 2014 (6 July 2014) and Sopot Gulf of Art (26 July 2014) that year.

Ware contributed a song for Nicki Minaj's third studio album, The Pinkprint (2014), called "The Crying Game" in which Minaj alternates between "devastating verses and pensive crooning" whilst Ware adds "haunting" and "soulful" vocals to the chorus. Originally, Ware only received a songwriting credit, but she was then credited on updated versions of the album.  She also co-wrote the song "New Man" for Ed Sheeran's third album, ÷, and provided background vocals on it and two other songs.

In October 2017, Ware returned to the stage after a two-year absence in anticipation of the release of her third studio album, Glasshouse. Featuring contribution from Francis and the Lights, Ed Sheeran, Cashmere Cat, Julia Michaels and others, it was preceded by its first three singles "Midnight", "Selfish Love" and "Alone". Glasshouse debuted and peaked at number seven on the UK Albums Chart.

In October 2018, Ware released the single "Overtime", later to be included on What's Your Pleasure (The Platinum Pleasure Edition) in 2021.

2020–present: What's Your Pleasure? and That! Feels Good!
Ware's What's Your Pleasure? was released on June 27, 2020, after being pushed back from its initial release date of 5 June. The first single from the album, "Adore You", was released in February 2019. This was followed by "Mirage (Don't Stop)" in November, "Spotlight" in February 2020 and then "Ooh La La" in April, "Save a Kiss" in May and "What's Your Pleasure?" in July. The album was met with widespread critical acclaim. In April 2021, Ware announced an expanded edition of the album titled What's Your Pleasure? The Platinum Pleasure Edition with a June 11 release date, along with the release of the single "Please". The reissue features seven additional songs, including singles "Overtime", "Please", and "Hot N Heavy", and a remix of "Adore You", for a total of eight additional tracks. Later that year, she collaborated with Kylie Minogue on the reissue of Minogue's fifteenth studio album Disco entitled Disco: Guest List Edition. Their song "Kiss of Life" was released on October 29, 2021. Their collaboration after Minogue appeared on Table Manners in September 2020. In the episode, the pair spoke about writing together. Ware later joked that she'd "bullied" Minogue into a duet as the two further discussed a collaboration.

"Free Yourself", the lead single from Ware's fifth studio album, That! Feels Good!, was released on July 19, 2022 following a premiere at that year's Glastonbury Festival. It was produced by Stuart Price. The next single, "Pearls", was released on February 9, 2023, following a teaser posted a few days prior. Ware has teased tracks of various genres including R&B, house and soul, describing the record as "Remember Where You Are" but a "bit more soulful".

Other work 
Towards the end of 2017, Ware launched a podcast, produced with her mother, called Table Manners for Acast and Island Records about "family, food and the art of a good old chit-chat", featuring a new guest each week on the show. The first episode became available on 8 November 2017 and featured British singer-songwriter and friend Sam Smith. The show has since entered its tenth season, including guests such as Ed Sheeran, Randy Jackson, Nigella Lawson, Sandy Toksvig, Daniel Kaluuya, Paloma Faith, George Ezra, Annie Mac, Paul McCartney and Kylie Minogue.

On 23 January 2019, Ware announced on her Instagram that she had created a unique premium kidswear collaboration called "Anyware Kids" launching online and in selected retailers Spring 2019, developed by award-winning designer George Reddings. The website officially went live on 31 March 2019.

In 2021, Ware appeared as a guest judge on the second series of RuPaul's Drag Race UK. Her appearance was announced on 27 December 2020. She expressed her delight on Twitter, writing, "Dreams do come true!!!!! Had such a great time with them."

Philanthropy 
Ware is a UNICEF UK ambassador and travelled with them to Bangladesh, Cameroon and North Macedonia to see the work they are doing there to help children who have fled violence. On 15 November 2014, Ware joined the charity group Band Aid 30 along with other British and Irish pop acts, recording the latest version of the track "Do They Know It’s Christmas?" at Sarm West Studios in Notting Hill, London, to raise money for the 2014 Ebola crisis in West Africa.

Ware was also part of the lineup for "Artists for Grenfell" charity single which was released to raise money for the families of the victims of the Grenfell Tower fire in June 2017 and for The London Community Foundation.

Personal life 
In August 2014, Ware married her childhood friend, Sam Burrows, whom she had met at school, on the Greek island of Skopelos, where the couple had previously become engaged. They have three children: a daughter (born September 2016) and two sons (born June 2019 and July 2021 respectively).

Ware is Jewish. In 2021, she discussed her plans to have a Bat Mitzvah as an adult.

She is a fan of Manchester United F.C. She endorsed Jess Phillips as leader in the 2020 Labour Party leadership election.

Discography

 Devotion (2012)
 Tough Love (2014)
 Glasshouse (2017)
 What's Your Pleasure? (2020)
 That! Feels Good! (2023)

Tours
 Devotion Tour (2012)
 Night + Day Tour (2013)
 Tough Love World Tour (2014)
 Glasshouse Tour (2018)
 What's Your Pleasure? Tour (2021–2022)
 Love On Tour (2022) (Supporting Harry Styles) Chicago dates only

Awards and nominations

Throughout her career, Ware has been nominated for several awards including six Brit Awards nominations, four of them being for British Female Solo Artist. Also her debut album Devotion was shortlisted for the Mercury Prize for Album of the Year. On 17 June 2013, Ware was named as the Skiddle Artist of the Week.

References

External links

 

1984 births
Alumni of the University of Sussex
English Jews
English women singer-songwriters
English soul singers
English women pop singers
English feminists
Feminist musicians
Jewish singers
People educated at Alleyn's School
People from London
Singers from London
People from Hammersmith
Living people
British contemporary R&B singers
English women in electronic music
21st-century English women singers
21st-century English singers
Sophisti-pop musicians
Ballad musicians
Labour Party (UK) people
Island Records artists
Interscope Records artists
Jewish women singers